Češnjice pri Trebelnem is a small settlement south of Trebelno in the Municipality of Mokronog-Trebelno in southeastern Slovenia. The area is part of the historical region of Lower Carniola and is now included in the Southeast Slovenia Statistical Region.

Name
The name of the settlement was changed from Češnjice to Češnjice pri Trebelnem in 1953. In the past the German name was Kerschdorf.

References

External links
Češnjice pri Trebelnem on Geopedia

Populated places in the Municipality of Mokronog-Trebelno